Zachary Richard Veen (born December 12, 2001) is an American professional baseball outfielder in the Colorado Rockies organization. Veen was selected ninth overall by the Rockies in the 2020 Major League Baseball draft.

Amateur career
Veen attended Spruce Creek High School in Port Orange, Florida. As a junior in 2019, he was named The Daytona Beach News-Journal Baseball Player of the Year after hitting .414 with 36 stolen bases. He played in the 2019 Under Armour All-America Baseball Game and 2019 Perfect Game All-American Classic. In November 2019, he committed to play college baseball at the University of Florida.

Professional career
Veen was considered one of the top prospects for the 2020 Major League Baseball draft. He was selected ninth overall by the Colorado Rockies. He signed with the Rockies on June 24 for a $5MM bonus.

Veen made his professional debut in 2021 with the Fresno Grizzlies of the Low-A West. Over 106 games, he slashed .301/.399/.501 with 15 home runs, 75 RBIs, 27 doubles and 36 stolen bases. He was assigned to the Spokane Indians of the High-A Northwest League to begin the 2022 season. He was promoted to the Hartford Yard Goats of the Double-A Eastern League in early August. Over 126 games between the two teams, he compiled a slash line of .245/.340/.384 with 12 home runs, 67 RBIs, and 55 stolen bases while being caught nine times.

He played in the 2022 Arizona Fall League, where he batted .356/.467/.466, and led the league in stolen bases (16; while being caught twice).

References

External links

2001 births
Living people
Baseball players from Florida
Baseball outfielders
Fresno Grizzlies players